The 1959 Ladies Open Championships was held at the Lansdowne Club in London from 20–26 February 1959. 
Janet Morgan announced that she was to retire on medical advice after the 1959 Championship; she duly won an incredible tenth consecutive title defeating Sheila Macintosh (née Speight) for the fourth successive year in the final. Later in the year Morgan retired and married becoming Janet Bisley and the following year Macintosh would finally have the chance to compete without having to play Morgan.

Seeds

Draw and results

First round

denotes seed (*)

Second round

Third round

Quarter-finals

Semi-finals

Final

References

Women's British Open Squash Championships
British Open Squash Championships
Women's British Open Squash Championships
Squash competitions in London
Women's British Open Championships
British Open Championships
Women's British Open Squash Championships